Vishnugopa (IAST: Viṣṇugopa) was a Pallava king of Kanchi. He was the son of Buddhavarman.

He was one of the kings defeated by Gupta Emperor Samudragupta during his southern expedition. Mayurasharma established Kadamba dynasty taking advantage of the weakening of the Pallava power. 

A verse (lines 19–20) from the Allahabad stone pillar inscription of Samudragupta mentions Vishnugopa:

References

Pallava dynasty
Tamil monarchs